Desertification is a type of land degradation in drylands in which biological productivity is lost due to natural processes or induced by human activities whereby fertile areas become   arid. It is the spread of arid areas caused by a variety of factors, such as climate change and overexploitation of soil as a result of human activity.

Throughout geological history, the development of deserts has occurred naturally. In recent times, the potential influences of human activity, improper land management, deforestation and climate change on desertification is the subject of many scientific investigations.

Definitions of words
As recently as 2005, considerable controversy existed over the proper definition of the term "desertification." Helmut Geist (2005) identified more than 100 formal definitions. The most widely accepted of these was that of the Princeton University Dictionary which defined it as "the process of fertile land transforming into desert typically as a result of deforestation, drought or improper/inappropriate agriculture".This definition clearly demonstrated the interconnectedness of desertification and human activities, in particular land use and land management practices. It also highlighted the economic, social and environmental implications of desertification.However, this original understanding that desertification involved the physical expansion of deserts has been rejected as the concept has evolved. Desertification has been defined in the text of the United Nations Convention to Combat Desertification (UNCCD) as "land degradation in arid, semi-arid and dry sub-humid regions resulting from various factors, including climatic variations and human activities according to Hulme and Kelly, (1993)."

There exists also controversy around the sub-grouping of types of desertification, including, for example, the validity and usefulness of such terms as "man-made desert" and "non-pattern desert".

History

The world's most noted deserts have been  formed by natural processes interacting over long intervals of time. During most of these times, deserts have grown and shrunk independently of human activities. Paleodeserts are large sand seas now inactive because they are stabilized by vegetation, some extending beyond the present margins of core deserts, such as the Sahara, the largest hot desert.

Historical evidence shows that the serious and extensive land deterioration occurring several centuries ago in arid regions had three centers: the Mediterranean, the Mesopotamian Valley, and the Loess Plateau of China, where population was dense (Dregne, 1986).

The earliest known discussion of the topic arose soon after the French colonization of West Africa, when the Comité d'Etudes commissioned a study on desséchement progressif to explore the prehistoric expansion of the Sahara Desert. The modern study of desertification emerged from the study of the 1980s drought in the Sahel.

Areas affected

Drylands occupy approximately 40–41% of Earth's land area and are home to more than 2 billion people. It has been estimated that some 10–20% of drylands are already degraded, the total area affected by desertification being between 6 and 12 million square kilometres, that about 1–6% of the inhabitants of drylands live in desertified areas, and that a billion people are under threat from further desertification.

Sahel
The impact of global warming and human activities are presented in the Sahel. In this area the level of desertification is very high compared to other areas in the world as it is a leading part. All areas situated in the eastern part of Africa (i.e. in the Sahel region) are characterized by a dry climate, hot temperatures, and low rainfall (300–750 mm rainfall per year). So, droughts are the rule in the Sahel region. Some studies have shown that Africa has lost approximately 650,000 km2 of its productive agricultural land over the past 50 years; the propagation of desertification in this area is considerable.

The climate of the Sahara has undergone enormous variations over the last few hundred thousand years, oscillating between wet (grassland) and dry (desert) every 20,000 years (a phenomenon believed to be caused by long-term changes in the North African climate cycle that alters the path of the North African Monsoon, caused by an approximately 40000-year cycle in which the axial tilt of the earth changes between 22° and 24.5°). Some statistics have shown that, since 1900, the Sahara has expanded by 250 km to the south over a stretch of land from west to east 6,000 km long. The survey, done by the Research Institute for Development, had demonstrated that this means dryness is spreading fast in the Sahelian countries. 70% of the arid area has deteriorated and water resources have disappeared, leading to soil degradation. The loss of topsoil means that plants cannot take root firmly and can be uprooted by torrential water or strong winds.

The United Nations Convention (UNC) says that about six million Sahelian citizens would have to leave the desertified zones of sub-Saharan Africa for North Africa and Europe between 1997 and 2020.

Lake Chad, located in the Sahel region, has been hit particularly hard by this phenomenon. The cause of the lake drying up is due to irrigation withdrawal and the annual rainfall decreasing. The lake has shrunk by over 90% since 1987, displacing millions of inhabitants. Recent efforts have managed to make some progress toward its restoration, but it is still considered to be at risk of disappearing entirely.

Scientists in Africa are working on a project to limit desertification in the Sahel region. This project consists of planting a wall of vegetation as big as 7.775 kilometres long and 9 kilometres wide. The purpose of this vegetation is to retain water in the ground after rainfall. This helps turning land that has become unarable because of degradation into land suitable for agricultural use. Senegal has already contributed to the project by planting 50.000 acres of trees. It is said to have improved land quality and caused a increase in economic opportunity in the region.

Gobi Desert
Another major area that is being impacted by desertification is the Gobi Desert. Although the Gobi Desert itself is still a distance away from Beijing, reports from field studies state there are large sand dunes forming only 70 km (43.5 mi) outside the city.

Mongolia
In Mongolia, around 90% of grassland is considered vulnerable to desertification by the UN. An estimated 13% of desertification in Mongolia is caused by natural factors; the rest is due to human influence particularly overgrazing and increased erosion of soils in cultivated areas. The area of Mongolian land covered by sand has increased by 8.7% over the last 40 years (Li, 2000). These changes have accompanied the degradation of 70% of Mongolian pasture land. As well as overgrazing and climate change, the Mongolia government listed forest fires, blights, unsustainable forestry and mining activities as leading causes of desertification in the country. A more recent study also reports overgrazing as a leading cause of desertification as well as the transition from sheep to goat farming in order to meet export demands for cashmere wool. Compared to sheep, goats do more damage to grazing lands by eating roots and flowers.

South America
South America is another area vulnerable by desertification, as 25% of the land is classified as drylands. In Argentina specifically, drylands represent more than half of the total land area, and desertification has the potential to disrupt the nation's food supply.

Effects

Sand and dust storms 

There has been a 25% increase in global annual dust emissions between the late nineteenth century to present day. The increase of desertification has also increased the amount of loose sand and dust that the wind can pick up ultimately resulting in a storm. For example, dust storms in the Middle East “are becoming more frequent and intense in recent years” because “long-term reductions in rainfall promot[ing] lower soil moisture and vegetative cover”.

Dust storms can contribute to certain respiratory disorders such as pneumonia, skin irritations, asthma and many more. They can pollute open water, reduce the effectiveness of clean energy efforts, and halt most forms of transportation.

Dust and sand storms can have a negative effect on the climate which can make desertification worse. Dust particles in the air scatter incoming radiation from the sun (Hassan, 2012). The dust can provide momentary coverage for the ground temperature but the atmospheric temperature will increase. This can disform and shorten the life time of clouds which can result in less rainfall.

Food security 
Global food security is being threatened by desertification. The more that population grows, the more food that has to be grown. The agricultural business is being displaced from one country to another. For example, Europe on average imports over 50% of its food. Meanwhile, 44% of agricultural land is located in dry lands and it supplies 60% of the world's food production. Desertification is decreasing the amount of sustainable land for agricultural uses but demands are continuously growing. In the near future, the demands will overcome the supply. The violent herder–farmer conflicts in Nigeria, Sudan, Mali and other countries in the Sahel region have been exacerbated by climate change, land degradation and population growth.

Vegetation patterning 
As the desertification takes place, the landscape may progress through different stages and continuously transform in appearance. On gradually sloped terrain, desertification can create increasingly larger empty spaces over a large strip of land, a phenomenon known as "brousse tigrée". A mathematical model of this phenomenon proposed by C. Klausmeier attributes this patterning to dynamics in plant-water interaction.  One outcome of this observation suggests an optimal planting strategy for agriculture in arid environments.

Causes

The immediate cause is the loss of most vegetation. This is driven by a number of factors, alone or in combination, such as drought, climatic shifts, tillage for agriculture, overgrazing and deforestation for fuel or construction materials. Though Vegetation plays a major role in determining the biological composition of the soil. Studies have shown that, in many environments, the rate of erosion and runoff decreases exponentially with increased vegetation cover. Unprotected, dry soil surfaces blow away with the wind or are washed away by flash floods, leaving infertile lower soil layers that bake in the sun and become an unproductive hardpan.

Early studies argued one of the most common causes of desertification was overgrazing, over consumption of vegetation by cattle or other livestock. However, the role of local overexploitation in driving desertification in the recent past is controversial. Drought in the Sahel region is now thought to be principally the result of large scale sea surface temperature variations, largely driven by natural variability and the effect of industrial pollutants. As a result, changing ocean temperature and reductions in sulfate emissions have caused a re-greening of the region. This has led some scholars to argue that agriculture-induced vegetation loss is a minor factor in desertification.

Scientists agree that the existence of a desert in the place where the Sahara desert is now located is due to natural variations in solar insolation due to orbital precession of the Earth. Such variations influence the strength of the West African Monsoon, inducing feedback in vegetation and dust emission that amplify the cycle of wet and dry Sahara climate. There is a suggestion the transition of the Sahara from savanna to desert during the mid-Holocene was partially due to overgrazing by the cattle of the local population.

Human population dynamics have a considerable impact on overgrazing, over-farming and deforestation, as previously acceptable techniques are becoming less sustainable.

There are multiple reasons farmers use intensive farming as opposed to extensive farming but the main reason is to maximize yields. By increasing productivity, they require a lot more fertilizer, pesticides, and labor to upkeep machinery. This continuous use of the land rapidly depletes the nutrients of the soil causing desertification to spread.

Poverty
At least 90% of the inhabitants of drylands live in developing countries, where they also suffer from poor economic and social conditions. This situation is exacerbated by land degradation because of the reduction in productivity, the precariousness of living conditions and the difficulty of access to resources and opportunities.

Many underdeveloped countries are affected by overgrazing, land exhaustion and overdrafting of groundwater due to pressures to exploit marginal drylands for farming. Decision-makers are understandably averse to invest in arid zones with low potential. This absence of investment contributes to the marginalisation of these zones. When unfavourable agro-climatic conditions are combined with an absence of infrastructure and access to markets, as well as poorly adapted production techniques and an underfed and undereducated population, most such zones are excluded from development.

Desertification often causes rural lands to become unable to support the same sized populations that previously lived there. This results in mass migrations out of rural areas and into urban areas (urbanisation), particularly in Africa. These migrations into the cities often cause large numbers of unemployed people, who end up living in slums.

In Mongolia the land is 90% fragile dry land, which causes many herders to migrate to the city for work. With very limited resources the herders that stay in the dry land graze very carefully in order to preserve the land. With the increasing population of Mongolia it is very difficult to stay a herder for long.

The number of these environmental refugees grows every year, with projections for sub-Saharan Africa showing a probable increase from 14 million in 2010 to nearly 200 million by 2050. This presents a future crisis for the region, as neighboring nations do not always have the ability to support large populations of refugees.

Agriculture is a main source of income for many desert communities. The increase in desertification in these regions has degraded the land to such an extent where people can no longer productively farm and make a profit. This has negatively impacted the economy and increased poverty rates.

There is however increased global advocacy to combat desertification and restore affected lands such as the United Nations Sustainable Development Goal 15 amongst other countermeasures.

Countermeasures

Techniques and countermeasures exist for mitigating or reversing the effects of desertification, and some possess varying levels of difficulty. For some, there are numerous barriers to their implementation. Yet for others, the solution simply requires the exercise of human reason.

One proposed barrier is that the costs of adopting sustainable agricultural practices sometimes exceed the benefits for individual farmers, even while they are socially and environmentally beneficial. Another issue is a lack of political will, and lack of funding to support land reclamation and anti-desertification programs.

Desertification is recognized as a major threat to biodiversity. Some countries have developed biodiversity action plans to counter its effects, particularly in relation to the protection of endangered flora and fauna.

Reforestation 
Reforestation gets at one of the root causes of desertification and is not just a treatment of the symptoms. Environmental organizations work in places where deforestation and desertification are contributing to extreme poverty. There they focus primarily on educating the local population about the dangers of deforestation and sometimes employ them to grow seedlings, which they transfer to severely deforested areas during the rainy season. The Food and Agriculture Organization of the United Nations launched the FAO Drylands Restoration Initiative in 2012 to draw together knowledge and experience on dryland restoration.  In 2015, FAO published global guidelines for the restoration of degraded forests and landscapes in drylands, in collaboration with the Turkish Ministry of Forestry and Water Affairs and the Turkish Cooperation and Coordination Agency.

The "Green Wall of China" is a high-profile example of one method that has been finding success in this battle with desertification. This wall is a much larger-scale version of what American farmers did in the 1930s to stop the great Midwest dust bowl. This plan was proposed in the late 1970s, and has become a major ecological engineering project that is not predicted to end until the year 2055. According to Chinese reports, there have been nearly 66 billion trees planted in China's great green wall. The green wall of China has decreased desert land in China by an annual average of 1,980 square km. The frequency of sandstorms nationwide have fallen 20% due to the green wall. Due to the success that China has been finding in stopping the spread of desertification, plans are currently being made in Africa to start a "wall" along the borders of the Sahara desert as well to be financed by the United Nations Global Environment Facility trust.

In 2007 the African Union started the Great Green Wall of Africa project in order to combat desertification in 20 countries. The wall is 8,000 km wide, stretching across the entire width of the continent and has 8 billion dollars in support of the project. The project has restored 36millionhectares of land, and by 2030 the initiative plans to restore a total of 100millionhectares. The Great Green Wall has created many job opportunities for the participating countries, with over 20,000 jobs created in Nigeria alone.

Soil restoration 
Techniques focus on two aspects: provisioning of water, and fixation and hyper-fertilizing soil. Fixating the soil is often done through the use of shelter belts, woodlots and windbreaks. Windbreaks are made from trees and bushes and are used to reduce soil erosion and evapotranspiration. They were widely encouraged by development agencies from the middle of the 1980s in the Sahel area of Africa.

Some soils (for example, clay), due to lack of water can become consolidated rather than porous (as in the case of sandy soils). Some techniques as zaï or tillage are then used to still allow the planting of crops. Waffle gardens can also help as they can provide protection of the plants against wind/sandblasting, and increase the hours of shade falling on the plant.

Another technique that is useful is contour trenching. This involves the digging of 150 m long, 1 m deep trenches in the soil. The trenches are made parallel to the height lines of the landscape, preventing the water from flowing within the trenches and causing erosion. Stone walls are placed around the trenches to prevent the trenches from closing up again. The method was invented by Peter Westerveld.

Enriching of the soil and restoration of its fertility is often achieved by plants. Of these, leguminous plants which extract nitrogen from the air and fix it in the soil, succulents (such as Opuntia), and food crops/trees as grains, barley, beans and dates are the most important. Sand fences can also be used to control drifting of soil and sand erosion.

Another way to restore soil fertility is through the use of nitrogen-rich fertilizer. Due to the higher cost of this fertilizer, many smallholder farmers are reluctant to use it, especially in areas where subsistence farming is common. Several nations, including India, Zambia, and Malawi have responded to this by implementing subsidies to help encourage adoption of this technique.

Some research centres (such as Bel-Air Research Center IRD/ISRA/UCAD) are also experimenting with the inoculation of tree species with mycorrhiza in arid zones. The mycorrhiza are basically fungi attaching themselves to the roots of the plants. They hereby create a symbiotic relation with the trees, increasing the surface area of the tree's roots greatly (allowing the tree to gather much more nutrient from the soil).

The bioengineering of soil microbes, particularly photosynthesizers, has also been suggested and theoretically modeled as a method to protect drylands. The aim would be to enhance the existing cooperative loops between soil microbes and vegetation.

Desert reclamation 
As there are many different types of deserts, there are also different types of desert reclamation methodologies. An example for this is the salt flats in the  Rub' al Khali desert in Saudi Arabia. These salt flats are one of the most promising desert areas for seawater agriculture and could be revitalized without the use of freshwater or much energy.

Farmer-managed natural regeneration (FMNR) is another technique that has produced successful results for desert reclamation. Since 1980, this method to reforest degraded landscape has been applied with some success in Niger. This simple and low-cost method has enabled farmers to regenerate some 30,000 square kilometers in Niger. The process involves enabling native sprouting tree growth through selective pruning of shrub shoots. The residue from pruned trees can be used to provide mulching for fields thus increasing soil water retention and reducing evaporation. Additionally, properly spaced and pruned trees can increase crop yields. The Humbo Assisted Regeneration Project which uses FMNR techniques in Ethiopia has received money from The World Bank's BioCarbon Fund, which supports projects that sequester or conserve carbon in forests or agricultural ecosystems.

Managed grazing

Restoring grasslands store CO2 from the air as plant material.
Grazing livestock, usually not left to wander, eat the grass and minimize grass growth.  A method proposed to restore grasslands uses fences with many small paddocks and moving herds from one paddock to another after a day or two in order to mimic natural grazers and allowing the grass to grow optimally. Proponents of managed grazing methods estimate that increasing this method could increase carbon content of the soils in the world's 3.5 billion hectares of agricultural grassland and offset nearly 12 years of CO2 emissions.

One proponent of managed grazing, Allan Savory, as part of holistic management, claims that keeping livestock tightly packed on smaller plots of land, meanwhile rotating them to other small plots of land will reverse desertification; range scientists have however not been able to experimentally confirm his claims.

See also

 Aridification
 Deforestation
 Detention basin
 Soil retrogression and degradation
 Wadi
 Water scarcity
 World Day to Combat Desertification and Drought

Mitigation:
 Desert greening
 Ecological engineering
 Oasification

Other related portals:

References

Bibliography

 
 Barbault R., Cornet A., Jouzel J., Mégie G., Sachs I., Weber J. (2002). Johannesburg. World Summit on Sustainable Development. 2002. What is at stake? The contribution of scientists to the debate. Ministère des Affaires étrangères/adpf.
 
 Batterbury, S.P.J. & A.Warren (2001) Desertification. in N. Smelser & P. Baltes (eds.) International Encyclopædia of the Social and Behavioral Sciences. Elsevier Press. pp. 3526–3529
 
 
 
 
 Holtz, Uwe (2007). Implementing the United Nations Convention to Combat Desertification from a parliamentary point of view – Critical assessment and challenges ahead. Online at 
 Holtz, Uwe (2013). Role of parliamentarians in the implementation process of the UN Convention to Combat Desertification. A guide to Parliamentary Action, ed. Secretariat of the UNCCD, Bonn . Online at 
 
 Lucke, Bernhard (2007): Demise of the Decapolis. Past and Present Desertification in the Context of Soil Development, Land Use, and Climate. Online at 
 
 Millennium Ecosystem Assessment (2005) Desertification Synthesis Report
 Moseley, W.G. and E. Jerme 2010. “Desertification.” In: Warf, B. (ed). Encyclopedia of Geography. Sage Publications. Volume 2, pp. 715–719.
 
 
 Reynolds, James F., and D. Mark Stafford Smith (ed.) (2002) Global Desertification – Do Humans Cause Deserts? Dahlem Workshop Report 88, Berlin: Dahlem University Press
 
 UNCCD (1994) United Nations Convention to Combat Desertification
 The End of Eden a 90-minute documentary by South African filmmaker Rick Lomba in 1984 on African desertification

 Li, S.G., Harazono, Y., Oikawa, T., Zhao, H.L., He, Z.Y. and Chang, X.L., 2000. Grassland desertification by grazing and the resulting micrometeorological changes in Inner Mongolia. Agricultural and forest meteorology, 102(2-3), pp.125-137.

 Hassan, M.H.A., 2012. under the auspices of the International Center for Theoretical. Physics of desertification, p.1.

 Dregne, H.E., 1986. Desertification of arid lands. Physics of desertification, pp.4-34.https://link.springer.com/chapter/10.1007/978-94-009-4388-9_2

 Hulme, M. and Kelly, M., 1993. Exploring the links between desertification and climate change. Environment: Science and Policy for Sustainable Development, 35(6), pp.4-45.https://www.tandfonline.com/doi/abs/10.1080/00139157.1993.9929106?journalCode=venv20
Attribution

External links

 Official website of the Secretariat of the United Nations Convention to Combat Desertification (UNCCD)
 Procedural history and related documents on the UNCCD, from the United Nations Audiovisual Library of International Law
 Official website of Action Against Desertification, a United Nations Food and Agriculture Organization initiative of the African, Caribbean and Pacific Group of States
Global Deserts Outlook (2006), thematic assessment report in the Global Environment Outlook (GEO) series of the United Nations Environment Program (UNEP).

French Scientific Committee on Desertification (CSFD)

 
Environmental soil science
Paleoclimatology